Mahruzeh (also Romanized as Māhrūzeh; also known as Māhrazeh, Māraz, Mārūzak, and Maruze) is a village in Chahar Farizeh Rural District, in the Central District of Bandar-e Anzali County, Gilan Province, Iran. At the 2006 census, its population was 20, in 8 families.

References 

Populated places in Bandar-e Anzali County